"Stay" is a song by Russian-German electronic music producer Zedd and Canadian singer Alessia Cara. The single was released on 23 February 2017 through Interscope Records, and is also featured on the Japanese edition of Cara's second studio album, The Pains of Growing. The official music video was released on YouTube on 18 April 2017.

Composition
"Stay" is a dance-pop song influenced by contemporary R&B performed in the key of F minor in common time with a tempo of 102 beats per minute. It follows a chord progression of D–F–E, and Cara's vocals span from F3 to D5. The song introduction contain a sample from Banks's 2016 track "Poltergeist".

Music videos
A lyric video for "Stay" was released on February 23, 2017, and has over 486 million views as of December 2022.

A music video for "Stay" directed by Tim Mattia was released on April 18, 2017, and has 111 million views as of December 2022.

Chart performance
"Stay" peaked at number seven on the Billboard Hot 100 and number one on the Mainstream Top 40, becoming both Zedd and Cara's third top ten song on the chart.

Track listing

Charts

Weekly charts

Year-end charts

Decade-end charts

Certifications

|-

Riri version 

Japanese singer Riri covered "Stay" during a live performance at a Line Live special event. The cover eventually was released to digital stores on 20 June 2018 due to fan requests, by Interscope Records and Sony Music Associated Records.

Background 
In February 2017, Zedd performed "Stay" in Japan at a festival. He proposed a Japanese cover to Universal wanting the song to be "known to everyone in Japan". Amongst many candidates, Riri ultimately was chosen to cover the song. The cover was announced in March 2018 by Universal Music Japan. The song later was released digitally on 20 June 2018 in Japan only. The cover was included on the Japanese digital version of Riri's second studio album, Neo.

Music video 
A music video of Riri performing the song live was released by Universal Japan on 18 March 2018.

Live performances 
Riri performed the song live in Japan at a Line Live special event in Japan in March 2018. During the event, Zedd spoke with Riri regarding the cover.

Radio and release history

References

2017 singles
2017 songs
Zedd songs
Alessia Cara songs
Dance-pop songs
Def Jam Recordings singles
Songs written by Zedd
Interscope Records singles
Torch songs
Songs about alcohol
Songs written by Mood Melodies
Songs written by Sarah Aarons
Songs written by Noonie Bao
Songs written by Alessia Cara
Songs written by Linus Wiklund
Universal Music Japan singles
Sony Music Entertainment Japan singles